John Granville Woolley (February 15, 1850 – August 13, 1922) was an American politician, lawyer, and public speaker who served as the Prohibition Party's presidential candidate in 1900.

Biography

John Granville Woolley was born in Collinsville, Ohio, on February 15, 1850, to Edwin C. Woolley and Elizabeth Hunter Woolley. In 1871, he graduated from Ohio Wesleyan University and the University of Michigan in 1873 and later gained admission to the Illinois bar. He was elected City Attorney in Paris, Illinois, in 1875 and became Prosecuting Attorney of Minneapolis, Minnesota, in 1881. Two years after entering private practice in New York in 1886, Woolley, a reformed alcoholic, began a career of public speaking around the country. On January 31, 1888, he joined the Prohibition Party in New York City and later that year Clinton B. Fisk offered him a job to practice corporate law, but he rejected the offer.

During the 1896 presidential election there were attempts to draft him for the Prohibition presidential nomination, but he chose not to run. During the 1900 presidential election he ran for the Prohibition Party's presidential nomination and with the support of Hale Johnson, the party's 1896 vice presidential nominee who withdrew shortly before balloting, was able to narrowly defeat Silas C. Swallow for the nomination with 380 delegates to 320 on June 28, 1900. Woolley, along with Henry B. Metcalf, placed third in the popular vote with over 209,000 votes. In 1903, he received a single vote for Illinois's senate seat.

In the 1900s he was successively editor and part-owner of The Lever in Chicago and of the journal into which it merged, The New Voice, national organ of the Prohibition Party, founded in 1899. Woolley made two tours of Europe in 1901 and 1905 to speak for Prohibition. On January 4, 1913, he announced that he was leaving the Prohibition Party due to its vote totals continuing to decrease with every presidential election.

In 1922, he was commissioned by the World League Against Alcoholism to study prohibition in multiple countries, but died from a heart attack in Granada, Spain, on August 13, 1922.

Works

Seed
The Sower
Civilization by Faith
The Christian Citizen (1897–1898)
The Lion Hunter (1900)
Temperance Progress in the Nineteenth Century (1902)
Civic Sermons
South Sea Letters (1905)

References

External links
 

1850 births
1922 deaths
Candidates in the 1900 United States presidential election
Editors of Illinois newspapers
Illinois Prohibitionists
Lawyers from Chicago
Ohio lawyers
Ohio Prohibitionists
Ohio Wesleyan University alumni
People from Butler County, Ohio
Writers from Chicago
Writers from Ohio
19th-century American lawyers